Begovich is a surname. Notable people with the surname include:

John C. Begovich
 (born 1974), American actor
Tony Begovich (born 1967), Australian rules footballer

See also
Alexander Bekovich-Cherkassky, Russian general defeated at Khiva in 1717
Begović